The 2018 Dubai 24 Hour was the 13th running of the Dubai 24 Hour endurance race. It took place at the Dubai Autodrome in Dubai, United Arab Emirates, and ran between 11–13 January 2018.

Race result
Class Winners in bold.

References

External links
 

Dubai 24 Hour
Dubai
Dubai 24 Hour
Dubai 24 Hour